Duodenitis is inflammation of the duodenum.  It may persist acutely or chronically.

Symptoms

Known symptoms of duodenitis include:

 Abdominal pain
 vomiting
 nausea
 discomfort in stomach

Causes

Known causes of duodenitis include:

 Helicobacter pylori infection
 Coeliac disease
 Bacterial infection 
 Viral infection
 NSAIDs
 Autoimmune diseases (i.e. Crohn's disease)
 Duodenal lymphocytosis
 Idiopathic

Type 
Acute duodenitis 
Chronic duodenitis

Diagnosis

Diagnosis is generally made by endoscopy with biopsy to evaluate histology. Review of symptoms and associated conditions is important.

Treatment

Treatment is aimed at removing the irritant or infection.  Helicobacter pylori infection is usually treated with antibiotics.

References

External links 

Duodenum disorders